Bondage may refer to:

Restraints
Physical restraints
Bondage (BDSM), use of restraint for erotic stimulation
Self-bondage, use of restraints on oneself for erotic pleasure

Social and economic practices
Serfdom, feudal enslavement of peasants  
Debt bondage, a form of slavery which pledges debtors' labor or services as security for repayment of debt

In arts and entertainment
Bondage (1917 film), by American director Ida May Park
Bondage (1933 film), by American director Alfred Santell
Bondage (2006 film), by American director Eric Allen Bell
Bondage (play), 1991 work by Chinese-American playwright David Henry Hwang
Bondage (album), 2009 album by J-pop singer Nana Kitade

Other uses
Spiritual attachment, such as to physical world or evil compelling force, such as original sin

See also
Bondsman (disambiguation)